WMKB may refer to:

 WMKB (FM), a radio station (102.9 FM) licensed to Earlville, Illinois, United States
 WMKB-LP, a defunct low-power television station (channel 25) formerly licensed to Rochelle, Illinois, United States
 the ICAO code for RMAF Butterworth